Pottu Amman (film), a 2000 Tamil/Telugu film
 Pottu Amman (Tamil militant) (1962–2009), nom de guerre of Sri Lankan Tamil rebel Shanmugalingam Sivashankar